Acanthoponera goeldii is a species of ant belonging to the genus Acanthoponera. Described in 1912 by Forel, the species is native to North America and South America.

References

Heteroponerinae
Hymenoptera of South America
Hymenoptera of North America
Insects described in 1912